The Doña Lourdes Institute of Technology is a technical school in General Santos in the Philippines. It is a member of the JPSCD Industrial Corporation, managed by the Lautengco family.

Courses offered 
 Personal Computer Operations NCII 
 Computer Services NCII
 HealthCare Services NCII
 Hotel, Restaurant and Tourism Management
 Housekeeping NCII
 Front Office NCII
 Food and Beverage NCII
 Bartending NCII

Universities and colleges in General Santos